Nathan Thomas Schmidt (born July 16, 1991) is an American professional ice hockey player for the Winnipeg Jets of the National Hockey League (NHL). He previously played for the Washington Capitals, Vegas Golden Knights and Vancouver Canucks.

As an undrafted player, Schmidt signed with the Capitals in 2013 after playing for the University of Minnesota. He was claimed by the expansion Golden Knights in 2017, and was part of the upstart inaugural season of the Golden Knights that saw them become the first NHL expansion team to qualify for the Stanley Cup Finals in their first season against his former team, the Capitals.

Playing career

Amateur
While a member of St. Cloud Cathedral of the Minnesota State High School League (MSHSL), Schmidt was selected first overall by the Fargo Force in the 2007 United States Hockey League Futures Draft. His lone year with the Force came during the 2009–10 season, where he recorded 14 goals and 37 points in 57 games.

Schmidt played college hockey with the Minnesota Golden Gophers in the NCAA Men's Division I WCHA conference. In his junior year, Schmidt's play was rewarded with a selection to the 2012–13 All-WCHA First Team.

Professional

Washington Capitals
On April 2, 2013, as an undrafted player, Schmidt signed a two-year, entry-level contract with the Washington Capitals. Schmidt played the final eight games of the 2012–13 regular season and five postseason games with the Capitals' American Hockey League (AHL) affiliate, the Hershey Bears.

Schmidt started the 2013–14 season with the Bears but was called up to the Capitals after just one game. He made his NHL debut on October 12, 2013, against the Colorado Avalanche. He scored his first NHL goal on December 7, 2013, against Marek Mazanec of the Nashville Predators. Schmidt was reassigned to Hershey on December 15, 2013.

Vegas Golden Knights
After four seasons with the Capitals, Schmidt was left exposed by the club in the 2017 NHL Expansion Draft. He was selected by the Vegas Golden Knights on June 21, 2017. After going to an arbitrator in August, Schmidt signed a two-year, $4.45 million contract with the Golden Knights. During his first season with the team, Schmidt found success, putting up career high numbers in points and leading the Golden Knights in average playing time. He helped lead the Golden Knights to the 2018 Stanley Cup playoffs in their inaugural season, only to lose in the finals to his former team.

Prior to the 2018–19 season, Schmidt was suspended 20 games for violating the NHL's performance-enhancing drug use policy. He appealed his suspension, but the arbitrator upheld it. On October 25, while serving his suspension, the Golden Knights signed Schmidt to a six-year, $35.8 million extension.

Vancouver Canucks 
On October 12, 2020, Schmidt was traded by the Vegas Golden Knights to the Vancouver Canucks for a third-round pick in the 2022 NHL Entry Draft. He stated his unhappiness following the trade, citing a lack of communication with Vegas management and calling it "a tough pill to swallow".

Winnipeg Jets
On July 27, 2021, Schmidt was traded to the Winnipeg Jets in exchange for a third-round pick in 2022. Upon joining the Jets, Schmidt praised the Jets defence for being "physical" and their ability to skate and "get up in the play." Schmidt and his defensive partner Neal Pionk began the season strong by tallying six assists in their first six games. This offensive output continued into early November with Schmidt leading the Jets in scoring at home with eight assists and sharing the team leading plus-minus at home with plus-seven. Upon scoring his first goal of the season on November 11, 2021, Schmidt matched his points total from the entire 2020–21 campaign with 10 points. Despite Schmidt's production, the Jets defence struggled to gain points and held a 1-for-22 record by late November. As such, Schmidt was moved to their second power play unit alongside Josh Morrissey. Schmidt ended the month of December by missing one game and two practices due to a non-COVID related illness. Following the winter holidays, Schmidt was paired with Logan Stanley instead of his usual partner Josh Morrissey. As the Jets were eliminated from the 2022 Stanley Cup playoffs, Schmidt was named to Team USA for the 2022 IIHF World Championship.

On December 16, 2022, Schmidt was placed on long term injured reserve by the Jets after taking a hit from Nashville Predators forward Tanner Jeannot during a game. Following this, it was announced that he was expected to miss four-to-six weeks in order to recover.

Personal life
Schmidt was born to Tom and Joann Schmidt, and grew up in St. Cloud, Minnesota, with two siblings. Growing up, Schmidt also played football and baseball, before deciding to stick with hockey.

Career statistics

Regular season and playoffs

International

Awards and honors

References

External links
 

1991 births
Living people
American men's ice hockey defensemen
Hershey Bears players
Ice hockey players from Minnesota
Minnesota Golden Gophers men's ice hockey players
Sportspeople from St. Cloud, Minnesota
Undrafted National Hockey League players
Vancouver Canucks players
Vegas Golden Knights players
Washington Capitals players
Winnipeg Jets players
AHCA Division I men's ice hockey All-Americans